Intermittent rhythmic delta activity (IRDA) is a type of brain wave abnormality found in electroencephalograms (EEG).


Types
It can be classified based on the area of brain it originates from:
 frontal (FIRDA)
 occipital (OIRDA)
 temporal (TIRDA)

It can also be
 Unilateral
 Bilateral

Cause
It can be caused by a number of different reasons, some benign, unknown reasons, but also are commonly associated with lesions, tumors, and encephalopathies. Association with periventricular white matter disease and cortical atrophy has been documented and they are more likely to show up during acute metabolic derangements such as uremia and hyperglycemia.

Diagnosis

References

Electroencephalography
Neuroscience